The 1973 Hardy Cup was the 1973 edition of the Canadian intermediate senior ice hockey championship.

Final
Best of 5
Saint John 4 Rosetown 3
Saint John 4 Rosetown 3
Rosetown 5 Saint John 2
Saint John 3 Rosetown 2

St. John Mooseheads beat Rosetown Red Wings 3-1 on series.

Winning Roster
Jim Andrew
Doug Britton
Art Coleman (asst. manager)
Vic Comeau
John Dalton
Phil Doiron
Blair Forsythe
Norm Guimond
Alfie Handrahan
Bob Holder
John Jarvis
Wayne Johnson
Ray Lapointe
Lincoln MacKenzie
Doug MacPhee (coach)
Gary Marsh
Gary McGraw
Tony McGuire
Dave Nicholson
Earl Rice
Bill Small
Gerard Smith
Wayne Taylor
Barry Smith
Jack Woodhouse (manager)

Eastern Playdowns

Teams
New Brunswick: St. John Moosheads
Ottawa District: Embrun Panthers
Northern Ontario: Lively Cyclones
OHA: Georgetown Raiders

Playdowns

Western Playdowns

Teams
British Columbia: Prince George Mohawks
Alberta: Grande Prairie Athletics
Saskatchewan: Rosetown Red Wings
Manitoba/Thunder Bay: Warroad Lakers

Playdowns

References

External links
Hockey Canada

Hardy Cup
Hardy